Zoegeh District was one of six districts located in Nimba County, Liberia.

References

Districts of Liberia
Nimba County